Dennis Dougherty may refer to:

Dennis A. Dougherty (born 1952), chemist at Caltech
Dennis Joseph Dougherty (1865–1951), American cardinal of the Roman Catholic Church